Princess Azemah Ni'matul Bolkiah  (born 26 September 1984) is a princess of Brunei. She is the eighth child of Sultan Hassanal Bolkiah of Brunei by his former second wife, Puan Hajah Mariam.

Sports career 
Princess 'Azemah made her national polo team debut during the 2017 Southeast Asian Games in Kuala Lumpur. Her team concluded the tournament with bronze and alongside her team received cash incentive through the government’s Sports Excellence Incentive Scheme. Together with her brother, Prince Mateen, she played in the 2019 Southeast Asian Games in Calatagan. They finished Bronze in that tournament.

Public service 
Princess 'Azemah regularly attended charities and national events such as the Silver Jubilee and Golden Jubilee. Moreover, the Princess also promote health related activities. Her siblings included Prince Azim, Princess Fadzilah and Prince Mateen. In 2009, she and Fadzilah played for the Ivy League during the Setia Motors Netball Open Championship at the Hassanal Bolkiah National Sports Complex. On 19 March 2018, she attended and presented the Brunei Ladies Open Champion Trophy to Hong Ran from South Korea.

In an announcement made by ASEAN on 1 December 2021, Princess 'Azemah was among the ten sports ambassadors selected to promote gender equality prior to the 2020 Tokyo Olympics.

Personal life 
Her marriage with her first cousin, Bahar ibni Jefri Bolkiah took place on 8 January 2023. Bahar is a son of the Sultan's younger brother, Prince Jefri Bolkiah.

References

1984 births
Living people
Bruneian people of Arab descent
Bruneian people of Japanese descent
Bruneian people of English descent
Bruneian royalty
Bruneian polo players
Bruneian netball players
Daughters of monarchs